Białe may refer to the following places:
Białe, Kuyavian-Pomeranian Voivodeship, in north-central Poland
Białe, Masovian Voivodeship, in east-central Poland
Białe, Podlaskie Voivodeship, in northeast Poland
Białe, West Pomeranian Voivodeship, in northwest Poland
Bielsko-Biała, Silesian Voivodeship, in southern Poland

See also
 Białe Jezioro (disambiguation), various lakes in Poland
 Jezioro Białe (disambiguation), various lakes in Poland